Cambonilla is a genus of Cambodian and Laotian ant spiders first described by Rudy Jocqué in 2019.  it contains only two species.

References

External links

Araneomorphae genera
Zodariidae